Elizabeth Barchas Prelogar (born 1980; née Elizabeth Margaret Barchas) is an American lawyer who has served as solicitor general of the United States since October 2021. She served as acting solicitor general from January 20, 2021, at the start of the Biden administration, until President Joe Biden sent her nomination to the U.S. Senate on August 11, 2021, when she was prevented from serving while the nomination was before the Senate as a result of the terms of the Federal Vacancies Reform Act of 1998.

Early life and education 
Prelogar was born in 1980 and was raised in Boise, Idaho. She graduated from Boise High School in 1998. After first taking college courses at Boise State University at the age of 12, she attended Emory University, where she double majored in English and Russian and was a Fulbright Scholar. She graduated from Emory in 2002 with a Bachelor of Arts, summa cum laude. 

From 2002 to 2003, Prelogar studied creative writing at the University of St Andrews, receiving a Master of Letters with distinction. She then attended Harvard Law School, where she was an articles editor for the Harvard Law Review and a finalist in the Ames Moot Court Competition. She graduated in 2008 with a Juris Doctor degree from Harvard in 2008. 

She is fluent in Russian. While at Harvard, she won an Overseas Press Club scholarship to study Russian media and censorship.

Career 
After law school, Prelogar spent three years as a law clerk—first for judge Merrick Garland of the U.S. Court of Appeals for the District of Columbia Circuit from 2008 to 2009, then for U.S. Supreme Court justice Ruth Bader Ginsburg from 2009 to 2010, and then for Supreme Court justice Elena Kagan from 2010 to 2011. She then entered private practice as an associate at Hogan Lovells. She taught a course at Harvard Law School on Supreme Court and appellate advocacy.

From 2014 to 2019, Prelogar was an assistant to the solicitor general. She was briefly detailed to the Special Counsel investigation into Russian interference in the 2016 United States presidential election. In 2020, she joined Cooley LLP as a partner. She was named principal deputy solicitor general by President Joe Biden in January 2021 and served as Acting Solicitor General. On August 10, 2021, President Biden nominated Prelogar to the office of Solicitor General. Her nomination was sent to the Senate that same day. Her nomination was referred to the Senate Judiciary Committee, which approved it by a vote of 13–9.

On October 28, 2021, the Senate confirmed Prelogar as solicitor general by a vote of 53–36, making her the second woman to hold the position after Supreme Court Justice Elena Kagan. She was sworn into office later on that day.

Personal life 
Prelogar was Miss Idaho Teen USA in 1998, Miss Idaho USA in 2001, and Miss Idaho in 2004. Prelogar donated to the Barack Obama 2012 presidential campaign and Hillary Clinton 2016 presidential campaign. She also performed in a mock trial with Brett Kavanaugh in 2016 prior to his  nomination to the Supreme Court.

See also 
 List of law clerks of the Supreme Court of the United States (Seat 4)
 List of law clerks of the Supreme Court of the United States (Seat 6)

References

External links 
 Appearances at the U.S. Supreme Court from the Oyez Project
 

|-

1980 births
Living people
21st-century American women lawyers
21st-century American lawyers
Alumni of the University of St Andrews
Beauty queen-politicians
Biden administration personnel
Emory University alumni
Harvard Law School alumni
Harvard Law School faculty
Idaho lawyers
Law clerks of the Supreme Court of the United States
Members of the 2017 Special Counsel investigation team
People associated with Hogan Lovells
People from Boise, Idaho
United States Department of Justice lawyers
United States Solicitors General